The Very Best Of is a greatest hits compilation by New Zealand-born singer Mark Williams. The album was released in 1999. The album includes tracks from four of his studio albums; Mark Williams, Sweet Trials, Taking It All In Stride and Mark Williams ZNZ.

Track listing
CD (5233472)

References

EMI Records albums
1999 greatest hits albums
Mark Williams (singer) albums